The Pepperdine Waves football program represented Pepperdine University, then located in Los Angeles, California, in college football. Pepperdine discontinued football in 1961, citing cost concerns.

History 
The program began in 1946. The school then called itself George Pepperdine College. In their first season the team went 8-1-0, including a 38-13 victory over the Nebraska Wesleyan Plainsmen in the Will Rogers Bowl. The Pepperdine Board of Trustees ended the football program after the 1961 season, judging the cost of fielding a competitive team too high. Although Pepperdine  played basketball in the West Coast Athletic Conference, the football program competed as an independent. Between 1949–1954 the football program competed in the California Collegiate Athletic Association.

Home venues 
Pepperdine called multiple stadiums home during the short tenure of its program. From 1946–1947, 1949, and 1959–1961 the Waves played at Sentinel Field in Inglewood, California. For 1948 they played at Wrigley Field in Los Angeles, a baseball stadium and the home of the Los Angeles Angels of the Pacific Coast League. In 1950 Pepperdine moved to Gilmore Stadium for a season, but that facility's imminent demolition required yet another change. From 1951–1958 Pepperdine played at El Camino Stadium in Torrance, California.

Head coaches

References

 
1946 establishments in California
American football teams established in 1946
1961 disestablishments in California
American football teams disestablished in 1961